The following outline is provided as an overview of and topical guide to martial arts:

Martial arts – systems of codified practices and traditions of training for combat. While they may be studied for various reasons, martial arts share a single objective: to physically defeat other persons and to defend oneself or others from physical threat. In addition, some martial arts are linked to beliefs such as Hinduism, Buddhism,  Daoism, Confucianism or Shinto while others follow a particular code of honor. Many arts are also practised competitively, most commonly as combat sports, but may also take the form of dance.

Types of martial arts 

 Martial arts by form – some examples include:
 Boxing
 Fencing
 Karate
 Kick-boxing
 Kung fu
 Judo
 Jujutsu
 Mixed martial arts
 Stick-fighting
 Wushu
 Wrestling
 Martial arts by region
 Chinese martial arts
 European martial arts
 Filipino martial arts
 Indian martial arts
 Irish martial arts
 Indochinese martial arts
 Japanese martial arts
 Okinawan martial arts
 Korean martial arts
 Russian martial arts

History of martial arts 

History of martial arts
 Origin of Asian martial arts

Techniques 
 Grappling techniques
 Throws
 Grappling holds
 Joint locks
 Chin na
 Striking techniques
 Kicks
 Punches
 Jab
 Uppercut
 Cross
 Bolo punch
 Knee (strike)
 Blocking techniques
 Parry
 Stances

Martial arts equipment 
Boxing gloves
Boxing rings
Focus mitts
Hand wraps
Headgears
Hogu
Iron rings
MMA gloves
Punching bags
Martial arts weapons
 Clubs
 Bows
 Knives
 Practice weapons
 Shields
 Guns
 Sickles
 Staff or stick weapons
 Spear weapons
 Swords
 Batons
 Wrestling ring

Training techniques and equipment
 Chi sao
 Dojo
 Fechtschule
 Floryshe
 Jian
 kata
 Kihon
 Kumite
 Kurtka
 Kwoon
 Sparring
 Pushing hands
 Qigong
 Wooden dummy

Kinds of violent situation
 self-defense
 street fighting

Organizations
 ABADÁ-Capoeira
 Aikikai
 All Japan Kendo Federation
 British Judo Association
 Ki Society
 Pride Fighting Championships
 Japan Aikido Association
 The International Taoist Tai Chi Society
 The Jitsu Foundation
 Ultimate Fighting Championship
 United Fighting Arts Federation
 Bujinkan
 Genbukan

Famous Martial Artists 
The following list consists of various famous martial artists of all different types and throughout history.

 Bruce Lee, Most noted for career as an actor, however Lee was also a martial arts instructor, philosopher, film director, film producer, screenwriter, and founder of the Jeet Kune Do (JKD) martial arts movement.
 Jackie Chan, Most noted for his career as a martial arts actor. Chan is also an action choreographer, filmmaker, comedian, director, producer, screenwriter, entrepreneur, singer and stunt performer.
 Chuck Norris
 Steven Seagal, 7th-dan black belt in Aikido. Segal became the first foreigner to operate an Aikido Dojo in Japan.
 Miyamoto Musashi
 Ip Man, Famous Wing Chun practitioner who taught many other famous martial artists.
 Gichin Funakoshi, Creator of Shotokan karate.
 Kanō Jigorō, Founder of judo.
 Masaaki Hatsumi
 Tony Jaa, Famous actor, choreographer, stuntman, director, and former monk. Member of Muay Thai Stunt.
  Panna Rittikrai
  Dan Chupong
  Robin Shou, Famous martial arts actor who is most noted for his role as Liu Kang in Mortal Kombat.
  Sammo Hung
  Huo Yuanjia, Famous practitioner of Mizongyi and co-founder of the Chin Woo Athletic Association. Yuanjia is a national hero in China for defeating foreign fighters in highly publicized matches.
  Phillip Rhee, Famous practitioner of various martial arts (taekwondo, hapkido, kendo, wing chun, and boxing) and a successful actor.
  Jean-Claude Van Damme, Famous practitioner of various martial arts (shotokan karate, kickboxing, muay thai, and taekwondo) and a successful actor.
  Sho Kosugi, Practitioner of various martial arts and a successful actor, particularly in ninja films.
  Sonny Chiba, Practitioner of various martial arts, noted as one of the first actors to achieve stardom through his skills in martial arts.
  Zhang Ziyi
  Morihei Ueshiba, Founder of aikido.
  Mas Oyama, Founder of kyokushinkai karate.
  Yuen Biao
  Angela Mao
  Kathy Long
  Mark Dacascos
  Wesley Snipes
 Iko Uwais
  Dan Inosanto, Famous martial arts instructor who teaches, jeet kune do (JKD), filipino martial arts, shoot wrestling, brazilian jiu-jitsu (BJJ), muay thai, silat, mixed martial arts (MMA), and American kenpo karate.
  Tadashi Nakamura, Founder of Seidō juku karate.
 Wu Jing
  Carlos Gracie, Co-founder of brazilian jiu-jitsu (BJJ).
  Hélio Gracie, Co-founder of brazilian jiu-jitsu (BJJ). Gracie was also a 6th degree black belt jūdōka.
 Vidyut Jamwal, Action star popularly known as "The New Age Action Hero of Bollywood" is a trained martial artist since the age of three in the art form called Kalaripayattu.
  Conor McGregor A mixed martial artist who is famous for competing in the UFC and holding two championship belts simultaneously.
  Muhammad Ali

See also

 Duel
 Code duello
 Shaolin Monastery and Shaolin kung fu
 Qigong
 Martial arts film
 Wu Xia film
 Kung Fu (TV series)
 Qi
 Reaction time
 Wudangshan
 Yin Yang
 Ninja
 Samurai (bushi)
 hara
 Dantian
 Kiai
 Kimono
 Hakama
 Black belt (martial arts)
 Provost (martial arts)
 dan
 I.33
 Fechtbuch
 Shintaido
 Sensei
 Hand training
 Kathakali
 Seiza

Martial arts
Martial arts